Bharuch, formerly known as Broach, is a city at the mouth of the river Narmada in Gujarat in western India. Bharuch is the administrative headquarters of Bharuch District.

The city of Bharuch and surroundings have been settled since times of antiquity. It was a ship building centre and sea port in the pre-compass coastal trading routes to points West, perhaps as far back as the days of the pharaohs. The route made use of the regular and predictable monsoon winds or galleys. Many goods from the Far East (the famed Spice and Silk trade) were shipped there during the annual monsoon winds, making it a terminus for several key land-sea trade routes. Bharuch was known to the Greeks, the various Persian Empires, in the Roman Republic and Empire, and in other Western centres of civilisation through the end of the European Middle Ages.

In the 3rd century, the port of Bharuch was mentioned as Barugaza.

During the 8th century, the town of Bharuch was ruled by King Mayur giving rise to the Chaudhary Dynasty. The king ruled the city for 50 years and was popularly known as the 'Ace of Bharuch'.

Arab traders entered Gujarat via Bharuch to do business. The British and the Dutch (Valandas) later noted Bharuch's importance and established their business centres here.

At the end of the 17th century, it was plundered twice, but recovered quickly. Afterwards, a proverb was composed about it, "Bhangyu Bhangyu Toye Bharuch", which translates to "Bish-boshed, ever Bharuch". As a trading depot, the limitations of coastal shipping made it a regular terminus via several mixed trade routes of the fabled spice and silk trading between East and West. During the British Raj it was officially known as Broach.

Bharuch was ruled by Delhi Sultanate for 94 years, Gujarat's independent Sultanate for 181 years, Mughal Sultanate for 164 years, independent nawabs for 36 years and Maratha rule for 19 years.

Bharuch has been the home to the Gujarati Bhargav Brahmin community for ages. The community traces its lineage to Maharshi Bhrigu Rishi and Bhagwan Parshuram who is considered by Hindus to be an incarnation of Vishnu. The Bhargav community still administers a large number of public trusts in the city. However the present day Bhargav Brahmins have migrated to Mumbai, Surat, Vadodara, Ahmedabad and other countries like the US, UK and Australia.

Being close to one of the biggest industrial areas including Ankleshwar GIDC, it is at times referred to as the chemical capital of India. The city has chemical plants, textile mills, long staple cotton, dairy products and much more. Gujarat's biggest liquid cargo terminal is situated 50 km to the west of Bharuch, in Dahej. It also houses many multinational companies, such as Videocon, BASF, ONGC Petro-Additions,  Reliance Industries, Adani Ports & SEZ, Gujarat Narmada Valley Fertilisers & Chemicals, MRF Tires, Yokohama Off-Highway Tires, Jubilant, Aditya Birla Hindalco Industries, Gujarat Fluorochemicals Limited, ISGEC Hitachi, UPL (company), Gujarat Alkalies and Chemicals Limited, Deepak Nitrite, Torrent Pharmaceuticals, Petronet LNG, Godrej & Boyce, Piramal Group, Pidilite Industries, SRF Limited, Safari Equipments  and Welspun Maxsteel Ltd. The industrial estate of Vilayat houses the companies of Aditya Birla Grasim, Kansai Nerolac Paints etc., Jhagadia houses DCM Sriram Chemicals, Saint-Gobain India Ltd., PepsiCo India Holdings Ltd. among others. Because of the distinctive colour of its soil (which is also ideal for cotton cultivation), Bharuch is sometimes referred to as 'Kanam Pradesh' (black-soil land). Bharuch is also nicknamed as 'Peanut City' for its salty peanuts, locally known as 'Khari Sing'. www.bharuch.com

Etymology

It was known as Barygaza (meaning "deep-treasure"), Bargosa etc. for the Greek, and later the Romans adopted the Greek name of this port.

It was known as 'Bharuch' under Muslim rule, 'Bhadoch' under Maratha rule, and as 'Broach' under British rule.

Mythology

Hindu mythology

According to the Skanda Purana, before Bhrigu Rishi came here, Bharuch was the residence of the Goddess Lakshmi.

Bharuch derives its name from the great sage Bhrigu. The original name of Bharuch is 'Bhrigukachchha'. Bhrigu Rishi was one of the ten sons of Lord Brahma. There is also a story which indicates that Bhrigu along with his kin asked for temporary access to Bharuch which then belonged to Lakshmi since Bharuch is located on the banks of river Narmada also known as Rudra Deha. Chanra Mauli Mahadev is the Kul Devata of Bhargavs of Bharuch. Bhrigu never left the place and the Ashram of Brighu Rishi is located on the banks of Narmada.

Bharuch was considered to be sacred among sages, and they would come to Bharuch to pray. The priests of Bharuch were famous for their learning in the other regions too. As per the mythological stories, Agnihotri and Samvedi – the learned priests of Bharuch – were famous up to Kashi in the northern India.

Sages like Shukra, Chyavana, Markendeya and Jamadagni were from the lineage of Bhrigu Rishi. Parshurama (sixth incarnation of Lord Vishnu) was born in the seventh generation of Bhrigu.

According to the Skanda Purana, there are 55 tirthas located in Bharuch. Many great sages, such as Kashyapa, Kapila, Mandavya, Adi Sankaracharya, have performed penances in Bharuch.

Bharuch finds its mention in major Hindu scriptures, such as Bhagavata Purana, Shiva Purana, Skanda Purana, Kurma Purana, Matsya Purana, Ramayana Mahabharata, and Brhatkatha/Kathasaritsagara.

The Narmada is one of the Seven Holy Rivers of India; the other six being the Ganges, Yamuna, Saraswati, Sindhu, Godavari and Kaveri. It is believed that a dip in any of these seven rivers washes away one's sins. According to a legend, the river Ganges is polluted by millions of people bathing in it. To cleanse herself, Ganges acquires the form of a black cow and comes to the Narmada to bath in its holy waters. Legends also mention that the Narmada River is older than the river Ganges.

Mahanubhav Pantha

Bharuch is the Birthplace (Incarnation) of Sarvadnya Shri Chakradhar Swami who is, for some Hindus, the Incarnation of Supreme Personality of Godhead. He established Mahanubhava panth (also known as Jai Shri Krishni Pantha) in Maharashtra in 1267. Bhagavan Shri Chakradhar Swami propagated a religious movement, as well as social movement, in which all members were accepted irrespective of their castes, and the traditional ritualistic religion was rejected.

Jain mythology

Bharuch is also a sacred tirtha for Jains.

This tirtha is situated in the Bharuch city on the rail and road path, in the Shrimali Pole. Here we see the idol of Munisuvrata Swami; black in complexion and in Padmasana posture. In the history of the Jains, this ancient city is important from many points of view. Guru Gautama Swami eulogised Muni Suvrata Swami, who is installed in Bharuch, in his "Jagachintamani Stotra" composed on the eight tirthas, Bhagavan Muni Suvrata Swami gave sermons to a horse here.

Further, many prominent Acharyas built temples and composed works in this tirtha. In Bharuch, we are shown the Ashvavabodha tirtha of the times of Muni Suvrata Swami, Shakunika Vihara of princess Sudarshana of Simhaladvipa and also the Vihara which was ceremoniously raised by Acharya Hemchandra in which Kumarapala has waved ARATI; is now converted into a mosque.

In the opinion of Hindutvadi archaeologists, the Jama Masjid of the present Bharuch is "probably" this ancient temple. Some "believe" that in times of such invasions the idol of Shri Prabhu was kept at a safe spot, and, as time passed, new temples were constructed and the old idols were installed. Today the idol is found in the new temple. There are here eleven other temples besides this.

Buddhist mythology

Bharuch is mentioned in various Buddhist Jatakas. Bharuch was an important Buddhist centre in the 7th century and considered to be sacred among sages.

History

Bharuch is the oldest city of Gujarat. It is also the second-oldest city of India having displayed evidence of continuous habitation, the first being Kashi (Varanasi). Chandragupta Vikramaditya and other kings of the Gupta dynasty ruled this city up to the 5th century; it was then ruled over by the kings of the Gurjara tribe until the 7th century. The time period of 8th to 13th century was said to be an important and very well-known part under the rule of Rajput Emperors. Solanki dynasty's great emperor Siddharaja Jaisinh had built up Kot (fortification) and darvaja (doors) around the whole of Bharuch. The fort has a number of gates, which were later named 'Malbari Darvaja', 'Katopor Darvaja' and 'Zadeshwari darvaja'. In the first half of the 16th century, Bharuch was ruled over by Changez Khan. Then, the Mughal king Humayun took over in 1534 AD.

BC era
By the 6th century BC, the city was readily accessible to outside trade via land-sea routes reaching the Levant to the Arab and Ethiopian traders feeding goods westwards to the Egyptians, Greeks, Persians, Western Romans, Carthaginians, and eventually, the Eastern Roman Empires, and the Republic of Venice. It is likely even the Phoenicians knew of it; it has acted since antiquity as a link port to the luxury goods trade from the Far East and the interior of the Indian sub-continent to the civilisations of South-west Asia, the Middle-East, the Mediterranean basin including Northern Africa and Europe.

During the Prarga–Maurya period in Gujarat, King Pradyot Mahaveer of the Pradyota dynasty of Ujjain ruled over Bhragukutchh in 550 BCE. He was a contemporary of Gautama Buddha. The Theragatha, part of the Pali Canon written down in Sri Lanka in the 1st century BC, mentions Vaddha Thera and Malitavamba Thera of Bharukaccha, as contemporaries of the Buddha, while the Therigatha of the same canon mentions Vaddhamta Theri of Bharukaccha. The ancient Sri Lankan chronicle, the Dipavamsa, mentions that the legendary king Vijaya stopped at Bharukaccha for three months c. 500 BC.

Excavations near the banks of the river Narmada in Bharuch have revealed many archaeological and architectural wonders, mostly temples. Later Bharuch was part of the Mauryan Empire (322–185 BC), the Western Satraps, the Guptas and the Gurjara-Pratiharas.

The Maurya period was between 322 and 185 BC. The post-Maurya period is mentioned between 185 BC and 23 AD. Princess of Sinhala, Sudarshana had built the Shakunika Vihara in the Bhragukutchh during the rule of Sampati (229–220 BC), and a Bharuch trader became responsible for the memories of the princess. This depicts trade relations between Lata (South Gujarat) and Ceylon.

It was known to the Greeks and Romans as Barygaza, and probably had a settlement of Greek traders. As one southern terminus of the Kamboja-Dvaravati Route, it is mentioned extensively as a major trading partner of the Roman world, in the 1st century Periplus of the Erythraean Sea. One of the Periploi describes numerous Greek buildings and fortifications in the area, although mistakenly attributing them to Alexander the Great who never reached this far south, as well as the circulation of Indo-Greek coinage in the region:
"The metropolis of this country is Minnagara, from which much cotton cloth is brought down to Barygaza. In these places there remain even to the present time signs of the expedition of Alexander, such as ancient shrines, walls of forts and great wells." Periplus, Chap. 41
"To the present day ancient Drachmae are current in Barygaza, coming from this country, bearing inscriptions in Greek letters, and the devices of those who reigned after Alexander the Great, Apollodotus and Menander." Periplus Chap. 47

Kshatrapa era (c. 23–400 AD)
In the 1st century AD, kings of Shaka community established their rule in Gujarat. Nabhovaahan (Nahapana), the king of Bharukuchha was very prosperous. During the Kshatrapa era Bharuch port was very prosperous. It was a gateway of trading through land and waters both routes. Like other ancient ports, trading of slaves also took place at the Bharuch port.

During the decade of 70–80 AD, coins of Greek writing were used in Bharuch. The activity region of Jain priest Arya Khapoot (1st century AD) was in the Aatapata region of Bharuch. He had released the Ashvaavabodh pilgrims in Bharuch out of the control of the Bauddhas.

Seven caves have been discovered from Kadiyadungar near Jhajhapore, near Ankleshwar, of the Bharuch district. These caves are known as the Bauddha Vihaaras. It is believed that they were sculpted in the 1st or 2nd century.

Gupta era (c. 415–470 AD)
During this time kings of Trekootaka dynasty ruled the north of the Konkan and south of the Laata. Trekootaka ruled over the Surat district but the border of their state could not be decided. In the lines of Daspur of the weavers of Laata (South Gujarat) it has been mentioned that Sun-Temple was built in 437.

Maitrak era (c. 470–788 AD)
According to historical accounts, a kingdom with the capital at Bhinmal (or Srimal) was established by the Gurjaras. The kingdom of Bharuch was the offshoot of this Kingdom.

It is known that in 540 AD which dynasty ruled over the Bharuch state in 540, a Mahasamant named Sangramsinh ruled over Bharukutchh, But nothing is known about the king. Chinese traveller Xuanzang crossed Narmada river in 640 AD and recorded that Bhrugukutch (Po Lu Ka Che Po) had around 10 Buddhist monasteries with around 300 monks.
During this period Caliph Usman had attacked over Bharuch. In 648 AD, King Dhansen – four of Vallabhi had put winning camp in Bharukutchh. A Muslim traveller Al – Biladuri had written in his notes that in 713 – 714 AD.

Arab Muslim Governor of Sindh, Husam bin Amru came to Gandhar port by boat. He destroyed the idols and the temples and built Mosques in place of them in the time of 760 AD. Arab Husam bin Amru of Sindh had attacked the Gandhar port near Bharuch. In the post Maitrak era during 788 – 942 AD Rashtrakuta kings of south Laata ruled over Bharuch. Their reign was briefly interrupted by Umayyad incursions and raids however no annexation attempt was made by the caliphal governors of Sindh.

Chaulukya era (942–1304 AD)
In 942, Mularaja established the rule of Chaulukya (Solanki) dynasty in Anahilvaad Patan. Till this time the importance of Bharuch as the trade centre was continued. It was the capital of Laata region at the starting of the 11th century. It was the centre for the ships coming from China and Sindh in the 12th century minister Vastupala had established a library in Bharuch. It was also during the time around from 1008-1030 that Mahmud Ghaznavi had made several raids of Gujarat where he each time sacked the Somnath Temple. The Ghaznavid incursions ravaged the Gujarati countryside including the area of Bharuch.

Chakradhar Swami of Bharuch was during the era of Bhimdev 2nd. He established the Mahanubhava community which was spread in Maharashtra. In the 1100s the region was subject to more raids by the Ghurids under Muhammad of Ghor.

Middle Ages era (1293–1872 AD)

The middle era history of Bharuch district can be divided in three main parts, out of which, we can say that Delhi Sultanate era (1297–1407), Gujarat Sultanate era (1407–1573) and Mughal era (1573–1736). Broach was a center of a prosperous merchant community, and was one of the chief ports of Gujarat from ancient times to the first half of the 16th century.

Portuguese Attacks 
Until the beginning of the 16th century, the Portuguese Catholic Christians had little contact with the city, only in 1536 and 1547, when there were attacks on operations from Daman and Diu against the governors of Gujarat for not paying for the Posters (Cartaz) system. After the attacks when Jorge de Menezes plundered Bharuch in 1547, the city fell into insignificance.

In the 17th century the Dutch and British made it a center of their cotton purchases in Gujarat, and commercial warehouses were established in 1616 and 1618 by the British and Dutch (Valanda) respectively. After that, in 1675 and 1686, it was sacked by the Marathas. During this time period, Bharuch was handed over to Kutubuddin. Mughal Emperor Aurangzeb demolished the fortification and the fort in 1660 by attacking. Later on, he had built it again in 1686. In 1772, the British again attacked Bharuch, defeating Nawab Mu'azzaz Khan, allegedly with the help of his treacherous minister, Diwan Lallubhai. The British handed over Bharuch to the Marathas who ruled between 1783 and 1802. From 1802, Bharuch was returned to the East India Company under the terms of the Treaty of Salbai.

Bharuch was ruled by Delhi Sultanate for 94 years, The independent Gujarat Sultanate for 181 years, Mughal Empire for 164 years, Independent Nawabs for 36 years and Maratha rule for 19 years. During these times, revenue was collected from Bharuch and hundreds of people, especially the rich people, were killed. Same way in the cities on the banks of river Kavi in Jambusar taluka there were many big and rich Muslim communities. They were mainly formed by the foreign traders.

As part of the Sultanate of Gujarat, it was subsequently annexed by the Mughals, and finally by the British. It is also situated near a small City called Halderva where two Islamic priests were found performing miracles.

On taking a bird's eye view of the financial structure of the whole era of Gujarat's sultanate, it can be seen that the area was cheaper and prosperous also when Akbar had won over Bharuch during Mughal era it had 12 Paraganas. The annual growth of all 559 City of Bharuch, Hansot, Olpad, Mandvi, Galaa, Jambusar, Dahej, Koral, Ankleshwar and Tadakeshwar paraganas was Rs. 7.5 million. As given in the Tabaqat-i Akbari there is a description of severe drought and spread of contentious epidemic in Gujarat.

Mughal era (1605–1627 AD)
On understanding the importance of Bharuch district as the trade centre, British had taken permission from Jahangir for establishing the office during this era. Jahangir also gave permission for trade to the British. A big office building built by the Valandas in the 18th century, can be seen in the Kansarvaad in Bharuch. This building has a fort around it.

Attacks by the Marathas (1664 to 1685 AD)
Marathas had plundered Bharuch twice while it was under Mughal rule. Due to six droughts between 1681 and 1696, the prosperity of both the ports was ruined. By the end of the 17th century their place was taken over due to the development of Mumbai port. In 1772, after the control of Bharuch was taken by the British, Valandas also left their trade centre in Bharuch.

Independent Nawabs of Bharuch (1736 to 1772 AD)
When the Mughal subahdar Nizam-ul-Mulk was given the independent control of Bharuch as his personal fief, the Nizam soon threw off the suzerainty of the Mughals and started acting independent of Mughal rule. He appointed a loyal commander named Abdullah as the administrator of Bharuch with the title 'Nek Alam Khan'. Nek Alam Khan become independent of the Nizam's control in 1736 AD and assumed independent control of Bharuch. This is start of a very short lived dynasty of the Nawabs of Bharuch. Nek Alam Khan died in 1738 AD and was succeeded by his son Mirza Beg who also assumed the title of Nek Alam Khan. During this period independent Nawabs ruled over Bharuch. Mirza Baig, Ahmed Baig, Hakim Mirza, Mirza Muazziz Khan. The Royal Family Of Nawabs of Bharuch live in Jaora State Madhya Pradesh today. Currently in the family the only surviving Nizam is Mirza Shujat Ali Khan, he has 4 children, Mirza Hasan Ali Khan, Mirza Mustafa Ali Khan, Mirza Osman Ali Khan, Mirza Muhtesham Ali Khan.

Pre-independence era 
It can be said that the movement for freedom struggle against foreign rulers in Bharuch started in 1905. But before that in the struggle of 1857 also Bharuch district had played an important role. Bharuch had contributed in the Swadeshi and Home Rule movements also. In which Kanaiyalal Maneklal Munshi of Bharuch also joined the national struggle.

In 1930 the movement of Satyagraha had spread in Gujarat which had affected Jambusar also. On 12 March 1930 when Gandhiji started the Dandi March with some of his supporters, the route of Dandi Kuch in Bharuch district was from Devaataa City of Borsad taluka via Jambusar Amod on the other side of the river Mahi via Bharuch and Ankleshwar on the other side of the river Narmada and reaching Dandi via Surat. The Dandi Kuch arrived in Kareli City on 20 and 22 March 1930 became a memorial day in Jambusar which is a proof of the history of freedom struggle.

Kanaiyalal Maneklal Munshi a Gujarati Bhargav Brahmin of Bharuch district had participated in the Home Rule movement. He was imprisoned for participating in struggles of Bardoli movement in 1938, "Savinay Kanoon Bhang" in the 1930 and personal movement in 1940. Chunilal Shivlal Modi, who was born in 1913 in Bharuch, participated in the struggle of "Savinaya Kaanoon Bhang" in the 1930 at the age of 18 years. Chandrashankar Manishankar Bhatt of Amod played a leading role in spreading the movement of "Hind Chhodo".

Dinkar Rao Nabheram Desai of Bharuch participated in all the movements of freedom struggle and was imprisoned for five times. Tribhuvandas Chhaganlal Paalejwala of Palej City had played a leading role in picketing the foreign cloths shops in Bharuch in 1930. Manishankar Bhatt of Panjareli City had motivated the youth of the district to participate in the freedom struggle. Maganbhai Rugnathdas Patel of Bhadaam City had played a leading role in the Dholera movement in 1930.

Manishankar Ranchhoddas Sukawala of Bharuch had played an active role in non-co-operation movement in 1920–21.

Ratuprasad Nathalal Bhatt of Bharuch participated in all freedom movements and was imprisoned, Vinodchandra Chunilal Shah, "Savinaya Kaanoon Bhang" movement, Chunilal Dharamlal Shah of Amod and Chhotubhai Mitilal Patel of Tegava village had devotedly served the freedom fighters, Tribhuvandas Purushottamdas Luhaar (Sundaram) of Matar village, non-co-operation movement in 1920, Desaibhai Bakorbhai Patel of Kahanava village, historical Dandi Kuch, Nathuram Kashiram Bhatt of Raima village, Yashvantray Rajaram Joshi of Malanpore village of Hansot district, Shanabhai Jhaverbhai Patel of Uber village, Vitthalbhai Ranchhodabhai Patel of Sarbhan village, Raysangh Dabhai Parmar and Vishnu Dattatrey Bhoder of Bajodara village had participated in all the freedom movements in the district along with Chhotubhai Purani.

Surajben Hardev Banarasi of Aasta village of Hansot Taluka, who was born in 1905 and widowed at a young age, got renowned as the leading lady freedom fighter and female worker. She was imprisoned for participating in the freedom movement, contributed significantly in the activities related to the uplift of the women and activities of creative programs. Like the other districts of Gujarat Bharuch district also had participated actively in various freedom struggles and had suffered loss of property and lives of their citizens. Almost all the talukas of Bharuch district had enlightened their people about political and national spirit by participating in freedom struggle through local leadership and history is the proof of the activities of the uplift of the people by implementing the creative programs instructed by Gandhiji.

Geography and climate
It has an average elevation of 15 metres (49 feet). Bharuch is a port city situated on the banks of the Narmada river. The damming of the Narmada caused the original port facilities to close, the nearest port is now in Dahej. The Bharuch district is surrounded by Vadodara (North), Narmada (East) and Surat (South) districts. To the west is the Gulf of Khambhat.

Bharuch has a tropical savanna climate (under Köppen's Climate classification), moderated strongly by the Arabian Sea. The summer begins in early March and lasts until June. April and May are the hottest months, the average maximum temperature being . October and November see the retreat of the monsoon and a return of high temperatures until late November.

Very often heavy monsoon rain brings floods in the Narmada basin area. The Village had witnessed major floods in the past, but now the floods have been controlled after the damming of the Narmada.

Economy, commerce and industry

Bharuch has always been prosperous because of its location on the Narmada River. Although water tends to be scarce in Gujarat, one never finds difficulty in getting water in Bharuch. As a result of this, agriculture and other linked commercial activities have flourished in Bharuch. Bharuch is also a central stopping point for many villages spread around its boundaries. People from these small villages come to Bharuch when they want to shop for new clothes or make a major purchase. Lately, a lot of retiring expatriates have been returning to Bharuch and building new houses giving the economy a boost.

Traditionally, Bharuch has been the centre of the peanut processing and marketing industry with a well-established brand name around the country. Almost none of the peanuts are grown in Bharuch itself but the best of the crops from neighbouring regions are brought here for processing. Bharuch is also the home of the Bandhni method of clothing design and is well known for this traditional art form.

At present, this heavily industrialised area is renowned for its textile mills, chemical plants, long-staple cotton, dairy products, and much more. Gujarat's biggest liquid cargo terminal is situated here. It also houses many reputed multinational companies like Videocon, BASF, Reliance, Welspun Stahl, etc. Bharuch is a shopping centre well known for its salty peanuts. Because of the distinctive colour of the soil here that is ideal for cotton cultivation, Bharuch is sometimes referred to as 'Kanam Pradesh' (black soil land).

Over the past 60 years, a major part of the population has moved to countries like the UK, USA, the African continent, and other parts of Europe. This brings some economical boost to the local businesses as people come back for vacations and spend their earnings here.

Trade
Bharuch was a major sea port in the important pre-compass coastal trading routes to points West, perhaps as far back as the days of the Pharaohs, which utilised the regular and predictable Monsoon winds or galleys. Many goods from the Far East were trans-shipped there for the annual monsoon winds making it a terminus for several key land-sea trade routes and Bharuch was definitely known to the Greeks, the various Persian Empires and in the Roman Republic and Empire and other Western centres of civilisation, through the end of the European Middle Ages.

In the 1st century AD, Bharuch port has been mentioned as Barigaza. Bharuch which was a prosperous and powerful port was an important part of Gujarat until the 16th century. Arab traders used to enter Gujarat via Bharuch. British, Valandas, and others accepted the importance of Bharuch and established premises and local staff here. At the end of the 17th century, the city was plundered twice but resurged quickly after the plunder and a proverb/refrain arose, "Bhangyu Bhangyu Toye Bharuch".

As a trading depot, the limitations of coastal shipping made it a regular terminus via several mixed trade routes of the fabled spice and silk trading between East and West.

Narmada River's inland access to central and northern India and with a location in the sheltered Gulf of Khambhat in the era of coastal sea travel grew and prospered as a trading transshipment centre and shipbuilding port. Until very modern times the only effective way to move goods was by water transport, and Bharuch had sheltered waters in an era without weather forecasting, compasses, and when shipping was necessarily limited to coastal navigation, and the general east–west course of the Narmada gave access to the rich inland empires at the upper reaches of the Narmada, including easy caravan access to the Ganges valley and the plains of Delhi.

Broach then (1500-1700) was a major textile manufacturing hub. The Broach city was famous for its bafta in the West and Southeast Asian markets. Bafta cloth was among the leading textile products exported to Europe and other parts of the world.

Present industrial city 
Modern Bharuch is one of the most heavily industrialised areas, not only in Gujarat but in India as a whole, with many large chemical plants producing fertilisers, paints, dyes, cotton, textiles, and dairy products.

Bharuch has also the advantage of Gujarat's biggest liquid cargo terminal. A very large fertiliser, chemical companies, like GNFC Ltd. is also located in Narmadanagar (a suburb of Bharuch) since 1976.

Large Indian and multinational companies, like the Torrent Group, PepsiCo International, Guardian Corporation, Hitachi, Heubach Colors, Zydus Cadila, Cadila Health Care, Survival Technologies, Videocon, China Light and Power, BASF, Reliance, Tata Group, Aditya Birla Group, Welspun Stahl, Aventis, Gulbrandsen Technologies, Wockhardt, Rallis, Pfizer, Ciba, L&T, Bayer, Glenmark, UPL, Lupin, J B Chemicals, Gujarat Fluorochemicals, NTPC, ONGC, GAIL, OPaL SOlvay, Breeze Intermediates For Flavor & Fragrance Intermediates, Alliance Tyre Group, Fireminich, Astra Specialty Compounds, Dahej and GPEC, have set up manufacturing units in and around Bharuch and Ankleshwar.

Petronet LNG Ltd, one of the fastest-growing companies in the Indian energy sector, has set up the country's first LNG receiving and regasification terminal at Dahej. Dahej nowadays is considered to be fastest-growing industrial area with companies like ONGC, GNFC, Alliance Tyre Group, ABG Shipyard, First carbon, Indofil, Birla copper, Adani, Reliance,

Demographics
 India census, Bharuch had a population of 148,391. Males constitute 52% of the population and females 48%. Bharuch has an average literacy rate of 97.06%, much higher than the national average of 74%; with male literacy of 98.5% and female literacy of 95.5%. 10% of the population is under 6 years of age.

Civic administration
Bharuch is administered by the Bharuch Nagar Seva Sadan (Bharuch Nagar Palika). Bharuch is also the administrative headquarters of Bharuch District.

Bharuch Nagar Seva Sadan comprises 11 election wards and 44 seats (corporators). In the 2015, Bharuch Municipality elections, BJP won 31 seats, Congress won 12 and one seat went to Independent. R. V. Patel of Bharatiya Janata Party is the present mayor.
Amit Chavda of Bhartiya Janata Party is the present President (Mayor) of Bharuch Nagar Palika.

The city elects one member to the Gujarat Vidhan Sabha, and the district elects one member to the Lok Sabha. Dushyant Patel (BJP) is the representative to the Gujarat Vidhan Sabha. Mansukh Vasava (BJP) is the representative to the Lok Sabha.

Bharuch is considered to be a stronghold of BJP, and since past 25 years BJP has been winning in Bharuch Vidhan Sabha, Bharuch Lok Sabha and Bharuch Municipality. Bharuch City would be soon getting a municipal co-operation.

Culture

There are many religions being followed by the people of this city. Usually there is a sense of harmony and co-existence without incident. However, there have been situations in the past in which this delicate social fabric has broken down. Today the city is considered to be a great example of communal equality. The majority are followers of Hinduism with a very large Muslim minority.

As Bharuch is a renowned tirtha, also known as Bhrigu Tirtha, in many of the Hindu Puranas, it is a host of huge number of temples along the river side. There exists also a number of mosques in this city many of them having been built in the medieval area and the most famous one is known as Jamia Masjid Bharuch built in 1644 during reign of Shah Jahan.

Art and literature
Bharuch is renowned because of the internationally famous Pt. Omkarnath Thakur in the field of music. Writers such as like Dr. Kanaiyalal Munshi, Balwantray Thakore and Sundaram has bestowed Bharuch unique pride.

Raichand Deepchand Library was established in 1858. It is one of the oldest libraries in Western India. It has a collection of about  books including some rare manuscripts.

Ganpatram Desai of the Bhargav Brahmin caste of Bharuch wrote the famous book Bharuch Shaher No Itihaas in 1900. This classic piece of history is an excellent reference even today. He wrote another historical novel called Alexander Na Samay Nu Hind or India at the Time of Alexander.

Festivals
All major Indian festivals are celebrated in Bharuch. Bharuch enjoys a thriving cultural tradition and diverse traditions of different ethnic and religious communities. Popular celebrations and observances include Uttarayan—an annual kite-flying day on 14 January. The nine nights of Navratri are celebrated with people performing Garba—the folk dance of Gujarat—at venues across the city. The festival of lights—Deepavali is celebrated with the lighting of lamps in every house, the decorating the floors with the rangoli and the bursting of firecrackers. Other festivals such as Holi, Ganesh Chaturthi, Eid ul-Fitr and the procession of Tajia during the Muslim holy month of Muharram are integral parts of the city's culture. It is also well known for the celebration of Chandi Padvo which usually occurs around October. This day comes after one of the two biggest full moon days of the Hindu calendar year, "Sharad Purnima". On this day, people buy tons of Ghari.

The rain (Meghraja) festival celebrated in Bharuch during monsoon season is unique in the whole of India. In the whole country, the festival depicting the importance of ancient agricultural traditions is celebrated only here. Meghraja Festival is celebrated in the month of Shravan. A 5.5 feet idol of Meghraj (Lord Indra) is prepared from the soil of Narmada river and is worshiped for 25 days. A fair (mela) is organised during the last four days of this festival. This festival is celebrated only in Bharuch in whole of India.

Cuisine

Bharuch cuisine is similar to that of Surati cuisine. The most popular form of meal — a typical Gujarati thali — consists of roti, dal, rice and shaak (cooked vegetables, sometimes with curry), with accompaniments of pickles and roasted papads. Bharuch cuisine also includes perennial favourites such as "Mawa Ghari" (a type of sweet  pastry made from a laminated dough and filled with Khoa, different than Surati Ghari ), "Malai Ghari" (filled with sweetened clotted cream, a unique sweet of Bharuch), Khichu, Undhiyu, Khaman, Nylon Khaman, Phaphada and Jalebi. Unlike cuisines in other parts of Gujarat, Bharuch cuisine is quite spicy. In the cooler winter months, people eat Ponk, a roasted cereal. The roasted salty peanuts of Bharuch are famous worldwide.

Most of the food outlets serve only vegetarian food, as a strong tradition of vegetarianism is maintained by the city's Jain and Hindu communities. Roadside kiosks, called "laaris" or "rekdis", are quite popular.

Non-vegetarian food is also available in some Muslim-dominated areas. Novel dishes made from eggs (ghotala, kheema, half fry) are specialties which are savoured with much gusto. Apart from this the traditional mutton preparation of tapela, fish (patra macchi), and lemon chicken can also be relished.

There can also be found some of the famous food chains such as McDonald's, Burger King, Subway, Domino's Pizza and Pizza Hut

Transport

Bharuch is well connected to the rest of India by Indian National Highway 48 (Mumbai to New Delhi) and by the Western Railway Division of Indian Railways.

The 132-year-old Golden Bridge connects Bharuch to Ankleshwar across the Narmada, which connects Bharuch and Ankleshwar towns, has turned golden literally. This is the first time since independence that the bridge has been painted golden.
Bharuch roads and buildings department has painted the bridge golden. Golden Bridge is a part of Bharuch's rich history. The British, who needed a bridge across Narmada to enable easier access for trade and administration officials in Mumbai, built the Golden Bridge, or Narmada Bridge as it is named, in 1881.

The bridge got its name due to the massive expenditure incurred in its construction. It was constructed seven times after being damaged several times due to strong currents of Narmada water. It was said that the cost incurred was so high that with the amount spent the bridge could be constructed in gold. The bridge has withstood many floods and natural disasters like earthquakes and provides daily transportation to the people of Ankleshwar and Bharuch.

A new bridge connects to the national highway.

Local transport is provided mainly by auto rickshaws (3-wheeled passenger taxis running on petrol or diesel). Intra-district and Inter-state buses also serve Bharuch frequently, and services are available to most nearby cities within and outside Gujarat. Private bus operators also offer local services in and around Bharuch.

Air: The nearest airports to Bharuch are Surat and Vadodara, at a distance of about  respectively.

Indian Airlines and other private airlines connect Surat and Vadodara to Delhi and Mumbai, with onward connections to major cities throughout India and abroad.

Rail: Bharuch Junction railway station is a very busy junction, handling over 40 pairs of trains on the Mumbai-Delhi line via Ahmedabad.

The main trains which pass through the station are Mumbai-Ahmadabad Shatabdi Express, August Kranti Rajdhani Express, Mumbai-Vadodara Express, Jammu Tawi-Mumbai Central Swaraj Express and
Bandra-Dehradun Express.

Daily or multiple daily trains connect Bharuch to all major cities in Gujarat. Daily or multiple daily trains also connect to many smaller towns as well.

Long-distance connections are available to virtually all major cities in India with multiple daily services to Mumbai and Delhi.

There are also daily (or multiple-daily) trains to Jaipur, Bikaner, Jodhpur, Kota, Ajmer, Indore, Kolkata, Nagpur, Solapur, Raipur, Bilaspur, Rourkela, Amritsar, Jalandhar, Ludhiana, Firozepur, Bhatinda, Ambala, Panipat, Rohtak, Faridabad, Mathura, Dehradun, Pune, Goa, Mangalore, Kozhikode and Kochi (Ernakulam)- (and to several other stations en route).

Weekly (or multiple-weekly) trains are available for Udaipur, Lucknow, Bhubaneswar, Pury, Hyderabad, Mysore, Bangalore, Coimbatore and Tuticorin among others.

The major railhead to the north of Bharuch is Vadodara and to the south is Surat.

Indian railways also runs narrow gauge train services to Dahej and Jambusar.

Bus: National Highway 8 passes through Bharuch and has a good road network. The bus station in the heart of the city is one of the busiest in Western India. State transport buses and private luxury coaches connect Bharuch with various centres of Gujarat, Maharashtra, Madhya Pradesh, Delhi and Rajasthan.

Education

There are a number of schools and colleges in Bharuch which provide education in English and Gujarati mediums. Schools here are either affiliated to Gujarat Board, CBSE Board or the ICSE Board to name few Sabari Vidya Peedom, Aditya Birla Public School, AMICUS, Queen of Angels' Convent School, Holy Angels Convent School, Bharatiya Vidya Bhavans' Narmada Vidyalya, DPS, Sanskar Vidya Bhavan, Faith Calivary, J.B.Mody Vidyalaya.

Several colleges provide education in various under-graduate and post-graduate streams including commerce and science, Narmada College of Science & Commerce is the prominent known college since last many decades.  Narmada College of Computer Application (NCCA) in its campus is the only college in Bharuch District providing Master of Computer Application (MCA) course since 1999.

There are also several engineering colleges affiliated to the Gujarat Technical University including Government Engineering College, Bharuch which is centrally monitored, and SVM( Sa'd Vidya Mandal) Institute of Technology which offers graduate and post-graduate courses.

There are also several pharmacy colleges, a medical college, Agriculture College.

Shree Narmada Sanskrit Ved Pathashala is a 115-year-old institute that imparts education in Sanskrit at school, graduate and post-graduate levels. It imparts education in the fields of vedas, jyotisha, vyakrana, nyaya, and mimansa.

Sports

GNFC Sports Complex has a number of modern sport facilities, which includes Cricket Stadium (Ranji Trophy matches were also held here), golf course, tennis, table tennis, badminton, skating, swimming pool, gym, community science centre, snookers, pool, billiards, chess, cards, volleyball, and basketball.

Rotary Club also has facilities for sports like table tennis, swimming pool, skating, badminton and other indoor games.

Cricket is the most popular sport in the city. Munaf Patel and Rashid patel both played for Indian cricket team.

Shri Batuknath Vyayam Shala was established in 1913 by Chhotubhai Purani and Ambubhai Purani (propagators of Indian gymnastics/vyayam in Gujarat).

Shopping and recreation
There are various avenues for leisure time activities in Bharuch, and there are a few parks maintained by the municipal commission such as Narmada River Front. The city also has numerous privately owned parks; among them, J. B. Modi Park and Vasu Van Nisarg Udyan are the most popular and well-known. The river banks in the city provide places for walking and leisure activities, together with a couple of libraries and a few auditoriums. Bharuch is well known for its textile products. Salted peanuts and sweets of Bharuch are renowned worldwide. Jabsons, a well known export brand for peanuts is a notable shop in the Peanut Market. Of late there has been a boom in the retail sector in the city and there are new shopping malls and multiplexes opening up all over the place. There are now shopping centers including Reliance Smart Bazaar, Reliance Super Market and D-Mart and places like Pantaloons, Croma and Zudio. Bharuch City Center is where most of the famous brands can be found.

Healthcare
Bharuch has provided health care through hospitals and clinics. There are hospitals run by the government, private entities as well as charitable trusts.

It also has several clinics owned and operated by individual doctors and medical professionals. Pharmacies are also operated and run by individual people.

People from Bharuch
Mythological figures related to Bharuch include Bhrigu Rishi, Shukra, Chyavana, Chandra, Dattatreya, Durvasa, Vamana, Mahabali, Jamadagni and Parshurama. Notable historical figures include King Nahapana.

Notable people from recent times include:
 Ahmed Patel (1949–2020), senior leader of the Indian National Congress
 Cyrus Broacha (born 1971), Indian television personality, ancestors were from Bharuch
 Feroze Gandhi (1912–1960), was an Indian politician and journalist, husband of Prime Minister Indira Gandhi
 Godrej family, including Ardeshir Godrej and Pirojsha Burjorji Godrej, co-founders of the Godrej Group
 Kanaiyalal Maneklal Munshi (1887–1971), Indian independence movement activist, politician, writer and educationist
 Omkarnath Thakur (1897–1967) Indian educator, musicologist, and Hindustani classical singer
 Premchand Roychand (1831–1906), Indian businessman and merchant, founder of the Bombay Stock Exchange
 Tribhuvandas Luhar (1908–1991), Gujarati writer
 Shapurji Broacha (1845–1920), Indian industrialist and philanthropist, Sheriff of Bombay during George V's coronation in India

Broacha and Bharucha are common surnames among Parsis and Dawoodi Bohras originally from Bharuch.

Places of interest

Bharuch City
Bhrigu Rishi Temple. The temple of Bhrigu Rishi, one of the famous and sacred temples of Gujarat, is situated on the east of the city in Dandia Bazar area on the banks of the holy river Narmada. This temple, being visited by a number of pilgrims, has great religious importance to the people of Bharuch. Bharuch which was originally called 'Bhrigukachchha' derived its name from this temple. The temple was built in honour of the great saint Maharishi Bhrigu who was able to attain sainthood by reaching the perfect balance between wisdom and activity. It was here that Bhrigu Rishi wrote first Indian Astrological work, Bhrigu Samhita. He is said to have documented five million horoscopes, in which he wrote down the fate of every being in the universe.
Nav Nathas. There are nine Swayambhu (self menifested) Shivalingas located at different places in old Bharuch city. These Shivalingas are known as Nav Naths in Bharuch. They are Kamnath, Jwalnath, Somnath, Bhimnath, Gangnath, Bhootnath, Pingalnath, Siddhnath and Kashi Vishwanath. These nine shivlingas are said to be exist since time immemorial. It was due to these shivlingas that Bhrigu Rishi choose Bharuch for his ashram.
Dashashwamedh Ghat is situated on the bank of river Narmada near Dandia Bazar. This is the place where King Mahabali performed ten ashwamedha sacrifices. It is at this place where Lord Vishnu came in the disguise of Vamana and measured the whole universe with his three steps. There are many old temples constructed on this ghat which includes Ambaji Mata Temple, Umiya Mata Temple, Narmada Mata Temple, Kotirudreshwar Mahadev, Vamana Temple and many others. One must not forget to visit this ghat at early morning hours to enjoy the spiritual peace of this place.
River Narmada. Many ghats are situated on the banks of the River Narmada in Bharuch, which hosts a number of temples. The Narmada happens to be one of the most sacred river of India. It is believed that a dip in the Narmada river washes ones sins away, and that her divine sight alone makes one pure. According to a legend, the river Ganges is polluted by millions of people bathing in it. To cleanse herself, Ganges acquires the form of a black cow and comes to the Narmada to bathe in its holy waters. Legends also mention that the Narmada River is older than the river Ganges.
Temples swarm the city and each holds its own religious significance. The Swaminarayan Temple in Dandia Bazar area of city is 175 years old and hosts a palette of colour on its walls. Narmada Mata Temple, also in Dandia Bazar, is 150 years old and dedicated to Goddess Narmada. The Vaishnav Haveli enshrines an idol of Bal Krishna said to have come from Mathura in 1725. Behind the old Civil Hospital, the Khodiyar Mata Temple overlooks the low-lying area of furja and offers one of the best views of sunset in the city.
Other temples in old Bharuch city include Bahuchara Mata Temple, Sindhvai Mata Temple, Santoshi Mata Temple, Nilkanth Mahadev, Doodheshwar Madhavev, Nav Graha Temple, Kala Raam Temple, Dwarkadhish Temple, Dattatreya Temple, Shree Sheshaiji Mandir, Bhrigvishwar Mahadev, seat of Vallabhacharya, Gyaneshwar Hanuman, Rokadiya Hanuman, Bhid Bhanjan Hanuman, Ganapati Temple and many others.
There are many ashramas along the river side. Some of these ashrams also runs meditation centres, adhyatama discourses, etc. A few prominent ashramas to name are Ashoka Ashrama, Swami Omkarnath's Narmada Ashrama, Kusuma Pagala Ashrama, Swami Swyamjyotitirtha's Gyan Sadhan Ashrama, Vishwa Gayatri Alakha Dham, Brahmakumari's Anubhuti Dham, Swami Tadrupananda's Manan Ashrama, Hansdevji's Hans Ashramas, etc.
Shree Vishnu Ayyapa Temple lies on the Zadeshwar Road and is managed by the Hindu Kerala Community residing in Bharuch. Every Year during the end of December a beautiful procession is carried out to commensurate the pious "Mandalamaasam" where devotees across the district and nearby vicinity participate and celebrate.  
The Golden Bridge was built by the British in 1881 across the Narmada River to improve access to traders and administrators to Bombay. The structure was built with rust-resistant iron, and therefore, more expensive than modern steel, lending to the name Golden Bridge. This bridge connects Bharuch and Ankleshwar.
 Sona no Patthar (Golden Stone)
 Soneri Mahel (Golden Palace)
A fort which is around 1000 years old was built by Siddhraj Jaysinh, the then king of Gujarat. The fort is situated on a hill top which overlooks the Narmada river. Within the fort are the Collector's office, Civil Courts, the Old Dutch factory, a church, the Victoria Clock tower and other buildings. Around  from the fort there are some early Dutch tombs, overlooked by some Parsee Towers of Silence. Also there are many historical monuments built by the Dutch, Portuguese and British.
Gurudwara Chadar Saheb. In the 15th century Guru Nanak Dev, the first Sikh Guru, visited Bharuch. It is believed that when a boatman refuses to take him across the Narmadda, he crosses over on a cloth sheet or chadar. The Gurudwara was later constructed in Kasak area, on the site where he landed in Bharuch.
Some important temples in new Bharuch city includes Shaktinath Mahadev, Chandramaulishwar Mahadev (this shivalinga is made from mercury), Sai Baba temple, Gayatri Mata temple, Amba Mata temple and many others.
A unique feature of Bharuch is the Meghraja festival celebrated in the month of Shravan (August–Sept) for 25 days. A 5.5 feet idol if Meghraj (Lord Indra) is prepared from the soil of Narmada river and is worshiped for 25 days. A fair (mela) is organised during the last 4 days of this festival. The unique feature is that this festival is celebrated only in Bharuch in whole of India.
Jainism and Buddhism had also a significant role in history of Bharuch and there are many Jain temples with architectural excellence.
Islamic buildings like Eidgah (built in 1326), Jama Masjid and Madresa Mosque
The crowded but fascinating bazaar known as Katopore Bazar.
Swaminarayan Mandir in Zadeshwar lies on the NH-8 and attracts a huge number of devotees from Bharuch and nearby areas.
Bharuch hosts one of the oldest libraries of Gujarat – Raichand Deepchand Library, started in 1858. It has a collection of around Two Lacs (200,000) books. There are many other libraries in the city.

Surrounding area
The most famous of them is Shukleshwar Mahadev Temple. Legend says that Shiva was pleased with the devout Chanakya and guided him to salvation. He instructed Chanakya to start his journey in a black boat at the mouth of the Narmada dress in black and accompanied by a black cow. The place where black would transform into white would mark the location of his liberation. The transformation occurred in Shuklatirth. Shiva stayed with Chanakya at this site in the form of a linga. It is believed that this temple houses that same linga, and that by praying here all sins are purged and desires fulfilled. The Omkarnath Vishnu Mandir has a tall white idol of Vishnu said to have emerged from the Narmada. This idol is made up of sand (it is a self manifested idol), but it appears as if it is made from marble.
Kabirvad is the island of Banyan trees. The main attraction here is a gigantic banyan tree covering an area of more than 2.5 acres. According to legend, it is at this place that saint Kabirdas meditated and the tree grew from a meswak stick (used for brushing the teeth) that was thrown here by the saint. A single tree has over years proliferated into a tree with several trunks and spread in over 2.5 acres of land. Other added attractions here are the lotus shaped marble temple, Kabir museum and boat ride on Narmada river.
This temple opens only on Tuesdays attracting a huge number of devotees.
It is said that temple is very old. Large number of people from different parts of the world visit this temple is the testimony of people faith in the divine power of this grand old deity. A fair is organised at this place on every Saturday in the month of Shravan. At this time, deevotees from Bharuch, Ankleshwar and other places go to this place walking.
Important places here include Antarnath Mahadev and Ram Kund. Today Ankleshwar is a highly industralised city and it has the honour of being the biggest Industrial Complex in whole of Asia.
Other important places on the banks of Narmada include Angareshwar, Mangleshwar, Nikora, Janor, Sajod (hermitage of sage Chyavana), Hansot, Jageshwar, and Dahej.

Other places of interest
The Statue of Unity
Stambheshwar Mahadev – Kavi Kamboi ( from Bharuch) at the estuary of the Mahi River. This Shivalinga is flooded at high tides; not during low tides.
Rajpipla
Garudeshwar – Samadhi of Vasudevanand Saraswati
Sardar Sarovar Dam
Chandod
Anasuya (near Chandod) – birthplace of Dattatreya, Chandra and Durvasa
Kayavarohan
Shoolpaneshwar Wildlife Sanctuary

See also
Bharucha
Ankleshwar
Bafta cloth

Notes

References

Further reading

External links

 :gu:ભરૂચ
 Indo-Greek Kingdom
 Periplus of the Erythraean Sea

 
Cities and towns in Bharuch district
Gulf of Khambhat
Port cities in India